Leonardi may refer to:

Biology
Anomochilus leonardi, snake
Austrocordulia leonardi, dragonfly
Conus leonardi, predatory sea snail
Phlyctimantis leonardi, frog
Rafflesia leonardi, parasitic plant

Other uses
Leonardi (surname), including a list of people with the name
Leonardi, California, a community in El Dorado County

See also 
Leonhardi, a surname